Université-de-Montréal station is a Montreal Metro station in the borough of Côte-des-Neiges–Notre-Dame-de-Grâce of Montreal, Quebec, Canada. It is operated by the Société de transport de Montréal (STM) and serves the Blue Line.

Overview 

It is a normal side platform station. Constructed in the side of Mount Royal, it is the network's highest station in elevation.

It has three entrances. The main entrance, facing boul. Édouard-Montpetit, and the Université de Montréal entrance adjacent to the entrance of La Rampe escalator tunnel leading to the university's main pavilion, open directly onto the ticket hall. A third entrance on av. Louis-Colin is connected by a walkway leading over the platforms through the station cavern.

The station contains two works of art in terra cotta by architect André Léonard. The larger, located above the ticket hall, is entitled Les quatre éléments; the smaller is located at the end of the walkway to the Louis-Colin entrance.

The station is equipped with the MétroVision information screens which displays news, commercials, and the time till the next train.

Origin of name
The station derives its name from the Université de Montréal under the campus of which it lies.

Connecting bus routes

Nearby points of interest
Université de Montréal
École Polytechnique de Montréal
École des Hautes Études Commerciales de Montréal
Collège Jean-de-Brébeuf
Hôpital Sainte-Justine

References

External links
Université-de-Montréal (Montreal Metro) - Official site of station
Montreal by Metro, metrodemontreal.com
 2011 STM System Map
 Metro Map

Blue Line (Montreal Metro)
Mount Royal
Université de Montréal
Côte-des-Neiges–Notre-Dame-de-Grâce
Railway stations in Canada opened in 1988
Railway stations in Canada at university and college campuses